S. A. Chandrasekar (born 2 July 1945) is an Indian film director, producer, writer, and actor who primarily works within Kollywood. He made his directorial debut with Aval Oru Pachai Kuzhanthai (1978), He got his breakthrough with Sattam Oru Iruttarai (1981). He has directed over 70 movies in all south Indian languages, and is known for directing films focusing on social issues.

Personal life
Chandrasekhar had a daughter named Vidya; who died at the age of two. His brother-in-law, S. N. Surendar is a playback singer and voice artist and his nephew Vikranth is an actor.

Film career
Chandrasekar has directed over 70 movies in Tamil, Telugu, Kannada and Hindi. Directors S. Shankar, M. Rajesh, Ponram   had worked with him as assistants.

Some of his hit movies include Sattam Oru Iruttarai (1981), Chattaniki Kallu Levu (1981), Nyaya Ellide (1982), Palletoori Monagadu (1983), Saatchi (1983), Vetri (1984), Naan Sigappu Manithan (1985), Sattam Oru Vilayaattu (1987), Sendhoorapandi (1993), Rasigan (1994), Deva (1995), Once More (1997) and Nenjirukkum Varai (2006).

He introduced Vijay and directed several films in his formative years such as Naalaiya Theerpu (1992), Sendhoorapandi (1993), Rasigan (1994), Deva (1995) and Vishnu (1995).
Most of his movies are with Vijayakanth and Vijay.

He also directed Telugu movies such as Chattaniki Kallu Levu (1981) and Palletoori Monagadu (1983) with Chiranjeevi.

He has appeared in supporting roles in some movies such as Kudumbam (1984), Pudhu Yugam (1985), Naan Sigappu Manithan (1985), Neethiyin Marupakkam (1985), Enakku Nane Needipathi (1986), Vasantha Raagam (1986), Nilave Malare (1986),  Neethikku Thandanai (1987), Sattam Oru Vilayaattu (1987), Innisai Mazhai (1992), Deva (1995), Priyamudan (1998), Sukran (2005) and Kodi (2016).

In the early 2000s, Chandrasekhar slowed down his work as a director and focused on business interests, including on the construction of a three star hotel for his son. In 2000, he began pre-production work on a film titled Dhoosi with Sarathkumar but the project was later shelved.

He turned as the lead actor at the age of 70 in Touring Talkies (2015) which is also his last directorial venture. S. A. Chandrasekhar returned after a break with a biopic on social activist Traffic Ramasamy (2018). In 2019, he directed his 70th film titled Capmaari.

Chandrasekhar spoke at the music launch of the movie Visiri held on November 22, 2018, at Vadapalani Prasad Lab, Chennai. He allegedly said "offering at Tirupati Hundiyal was like a bribe to the deity and one cannot pass the exam by simply making offering to a deity. If the offering to deity can help you pass the exams, you don't need to write the exams and sit at home". He also said that "success can be achieved only by studying." Virugambakkam police registered a FIR against Chandrasekhar on charges of hurting religious beliefs after a complaint filed by Hindu Munnani over his statements.

Filmography

References

Film directors from Tamil Nadu
Tamil film directors
Living people
People from Ramanathapuram district
20th-century Indian film directors
21st-century Indian film directors
Telugu film directors
Hindi-language film directors
Kannada film directors
Screenwriters from Tamil Nadu
Film producers from Tamil Nadu
Tamil screenwriters
Tamil film producers
Tamil cinema
1945 births